Cels is a surname. Notable people with this surname include:

 Cornelis Cels (1778 – 1859), a Flemish painter
 Jacques Philippe Martin Cels (1740–1806), a French botanist
 Jean-Michel Cels (1819 – 1894), a Belgian landscape painter
Luis Siret y Cels, Belgian-Spanish archaeologist and illustrator